Velgast is a railway station in the town of Velgast, Mecklenburg-Vorpommern, Germany. The station lies on the Rostock-Stralsund railway and Velgast-Barth railway and the train services are operated by Deutsche Bahn and Ostdeutsche Eisenbahn.

Train services
The station is served by the following services:

References

Railway stations in Mecklenburg-Western Pomerania
Railway stations in Germany opened in 1889
Buildings and structures in Vorpommern-Rügen